Cicuco Airport  is an airport serving the town of Cicuco in the Bolívar Department of Colombia. The airport is near the Ciénega El Medio, an arm of the Magdalena River.

See also

Transport in Colombia
List of airports in Colombia

References

External links
OurAirports - Cicuco Airport
FallingRain - Cicuco Airport

Airports in Colombia